Paraperlucidibaca baekdonensis is a Gram-negative, strictly aerobic, catalase-negative, oxidase-positive, rod-shaped, nonmotile bacterium of the genus Paraperlucidibaca, which was isolated from seawater of Baekdo Harbor in the Sea of Japan.

References

External links
Type strain of Paraperlucidibaca baekdonensis at BacDive -  the Bacterial Diversity Metadatabase

Moraxellaceae
Bacteria described in 2011